The House in Montevideo (German: Das Haus in Montevideo) is a 1945 German comedy play by Curt Goetz. A strait-laced father of twelve discovers that his long-lost sister, who had been cast out of the family for having a child out of wedlock, has made a career as an opera singer in Montevideo in Uruguay, and has now died, leaving some real estate as dowry to his eldest daughter, but the bulk of her considerable fortune to any female in her brother's household, who will undergo "a tragedy similar to hers", that is, give birth to an illegitimate child. The father thus makes some immoral suggestions to his oldest daughter, Atlanta, who was named after the ship on which the couple was married at sea. When the daughter wants to get married on the very same ship, "a tragedy" occurs, and not one but two land based weddings follow.

The play was staged in 1945 on Broadway as It's a Gift, starring Goetz and his wife. The story was based on a 1924 one-act play The Dead Aunt, which Goetz expanded and revised for the new work.

Adaptations
The play has been turned into films twice: a 1951 film The House in Montevideo starring Goetz himself and his wife Valérie von Martens and a 1963 version The House in Montevideo starring Heinz Rühmann and Ruth Leuwerik.

References

Bibliography
 Grange, William. Historical Dictionary of German Literature To 1945. Scarecrow Press, 2010.

Plays by Curt Goetz
1945 plays
Swiss plays adapted into films